The canton of Cadenet is a French former administrative division in the department of Vaucluse and region Provence-Alpes-Côte d'Azur. It had 18,006 inhabitants (2012). It was disbanded following the French canton reorganisation which came into effect in March 2015.

The canton comprised the following communes:

Cadenet
Cucuron
Lauris
Lourmarin
Mérindol
Puget 
Puyvert
Vaugines
Villelaure

References

Cadenet
2015 disestablishments in France
States and territories disestablished in 2015